Ruská Voľa (Rus’ka Volia) is a village and municipality in Vranov nad Topľou District in the Prešov Region of eastern Slovakia.

History
In historical records the village was first mentioned in 1357.
Other names of the municipality: 1588 Nowawolya, Volya, 1635 Volya, noviter sicata, 1773 Ruska Wolya, Orosz-Volya, 1786 Orosz Wolya, 1808 Orosz-Alsó-Vólya et Orosz Felso-Volya, Ruská Wola, 1863 Oroszvolya, 1907 Poprádokros, 1920 Ruská Voľa, 1960 Ruská Voľa, in Hungarian Poprádokros

Geography
The municipality lies at an altitude of 300 metres and covers an area of 6.182 km². It has a population of about 95 people.

External links
 
http://www.statistics.sk/mosmis/eng/run.html

Villages and municipalities in Vranov nad Topľou District
Šariš